The 2011 Masters of Formula 3 was the twenty-first Masters of Formula 3 race, and was held at Circuit Park Zandvoort in the Netherlands on 14 August 2011.

The race was won by Felix Rosenqvist, for Mücke Motorsport, who took advantage of a start-line collision between Spanish Prema Powerteam teammates Daniel Juncadella and Roberto Merhi. Marco Wittmann finished second, whilst Kevin Magnussen became the first regular from the British series to appear on the podium since Adam Carroll in 2004 by finishing third.

Despite his disqualification for causing the accident with Daniel Juncadella, Roberto Merhi sealed the inaugural FIA Formula 3 International Trophy at this race on the virtue of his closest rival, Marco Wittmann, failing to win the race.

Drivers and teams

Notes

Classification

Qualifying

Race

References

External links
http://forix.autosport.com/gp.php?l=0&d=401&r=20114000&c=0

Masters of Formula Three
Masters of Formula Three
Masters
Masters of Formula Three